γ-Aminobutyric acid (gamma-aminobutyric acid) , or GABA , is the chief inhibitory neurotransmitter in the developmentally mature mammalian central nervous system. Its principal role is reducing neuronal excitability throughout the nervous system.

GABA is sold as a dietary supplement in many countries. It has been traditionally thought that exogenous GABA (i.e. taken as a supplement) does not cross the blood–brain barrier, but data obtained from more recent research describes the notion as being unclear.

The carboxylate form of GABA is γ-aminobutyrate.

Function

Neurotransmitter

Two general classes of GABA receptor are known:
GABAA in which the receptor is part of a ligand-gated ion channel complex
GABAB metabotropic receptors, which are G protein-coupled receptors that open or close ion channels via intermediaries (G proteins)

Neurons that produce GABA as their output are called GABAergic neurons, and have chiefly inhibitory action at receptors in the adult vertebrate. Medium spiny cells are a typical example of inhibitory central nervous system GABAergic cells. In contrast, GABA exhibits both excitatory and inhibitory actions in insects, mediating muscle activation at synapses between nerves and muscle cells, and also the stimulation of certain glands. In mammals, some GABAergic neurons, such as chandelier cells, are also able to excite their glutamatergic counterparts.

GABAA receptors are ligand-activated chloride channels: when activated by GABA, they allow the flow of chloride ions across the membrane of the cell. Whether this chloride flow is depolarizing (makes the voltage across the cell's membrane less negative), shunting (has no effect on the cell's membrane potential), or inhibitory/hyperpolarizing (makes the cell's membrane more negative) depends on the direction of the flow of chloride. When net chloride flows out of the cell, GABA is depolarising; when chloride flows into the cell, GABA is inhibitory or hyperpolarizing. When the net flow of chloride is close to zero, the action of GABA is shunting. Shunting inhibition has no direct effect on the membrane potential of the cell; however, it reduces the effect of any coincident synaptic input by reducing the electrical resistance of the cell's membrane. Shunting inhibition can "override" the excitatory effect of depolarising GABA, resulting in overall inhibition even if the membrane potential becomes less negative. It was thought that a developmental switch in the molecular machinery controlling the concentration of chloride inside the cell changes the functional role of GABA between neonatal and adult stages. As the brain develops into adulthood, GABA's role changes from excitatory to inhibitory.

Brain development
GABA is an inhibitory transmitter in the mature brain; its actions were thought to be primarily excitatory in the developing brain. The gradient of chloride was reported to be reversed in immature neurons, with its reversal potential higher than the resting membrane potential of the cell; activation of a GABA-A receptor thus leads to efflux of Cl− ions from the cell (that is, a depolarizing current). The differential gradient of chloride in immature neurons was shown to be primarily due to the higher concentration of NKCC1 co-transporters relative to KCC2 co-transporters in immature cells. GABAergic interneurons mature faster in the hippocampus and the GABA machinery appears earlier than glutamatergic transmission. Thus, GABA is considered the major excitatory neurotransmitter in many regions of the brain before the maturation of glutamatergic synapses.

In the developmental stages preceding the formation of synaptic contacts, GABA is synthesized by neurons and acts both as an autocrine (acting on the same cell) and paracrine (acting on nearby cells) signalling mediator. The ganglionic eminences also contribute greatly to building up the GABAergic cortical cell population.

GABA regulates the proliferation of neural progenitor cells, the migration and differentiation the elongation of neurites and the formation of synapses.

GABA also regulates the growth of embryonic and neural stem cells. GABA can influence the development of neural progenitor cells via brain-derived neurotrophic factor (BDNF) expression. GABA activates the GABAA receptor, causing cell cycle arrest in the S-phase, limiting growth.

Beyond the nervous system

Besides the nervous system, GABA is also produced at relatively high levels in the insulin-producing beta cells (β-cells) of the pancreas. The β-cells secrete GABA along with insulin and the GABA binds to GABA receptors on the neighboring islet alpha cells (α-cells) and inhibits them from secreting glucagon (which would counteract insulin's effects).

GABA can promote the replication and survival of β-cells and also promote the conversion of α-cells to β-cells, which may lead to new treatments for diabetes.

Alongside GABAergic mechanisms, GABA has also been detected in other peripheral tissues including intestines, stomach, Fallopian tubes, uterus, ovaries, testes, kidneys, urinary bladder, the lungs and liver, albeit at much lower levels than in neurons or β-cells.

Experiments on mice have shown that hypothyroidism induced by fluoride poisoning can be halted by administering GABA. The test also found that the thyroid recovered naturally without further assistance after the Fluoride had been expelled by the GABA.

Immune cells express receptors for GABA and administration of GABA can suppress inflammatory immune responses and promote "regulatory" immune responses, such that GABA administration has been shown to inhibit autoimmune diseases in several animal models.

In 2018, GABA has shown to regulate secretion of a greater number of cytokines. In plasma of T1D patients, levels of 26 cytokines are increased and of those, 16 are inhibited by GABA in the cell assays.

In 2007, an excitatory GABAergic system was described in the airway epithelium. The system is activated by exposure to allergens and may participate in the mechanisms of asthma. GABAergic systems have also been found in the testis and in the eye lens.

Structure and conformation
GABA is found mostly as a zwitterion (i.e. with the carboxyl group deprotonated and the amino group protonated). Its conformation depends on its environment. In the gas phase, a highly folded conformation is strongly favored due to the electrostatic attraction between the two functional groups. The stabilization is about 50 kcal/mol, according to quantum chemistry calculations. In the solid state, an extended conformation is found, with a trans conformation at the amino end and a gauche conformation at the carboxyl end. This is due to the packing interactions with the neighboring molecules. In solution, five different conformations, some folded and some extended, are found as a result of solvation effects. The conformational flexibility of GABA is important for its biological function, as it has been found to bind to different receptors with different conformations. Many GABA analogues with pharmaceutical applications have more rigid structures in order to control the binding better.

History
In 1883, GABA was first synthesized, and it was first known only as a plant and microbe metabolic product.

In 1950, GABA was discovered as an integral part of the mammalian central nervous system.

In 1959, it was shown that at an inhibitory synapse on crayfish muscle fibers GABA acts like stimulation of the inhibitory nerve.  Both inhibition by nerve stimulation and by applied GABA are blocked by picrotoxin.

Biosynthesis

GABA is primarily synthesized from glutamate via the enzyme glutamate decarboxylase (GAD) with pyridoxal phosphate (the active form of vitamin B6) as a cofactor. This process converts glutamate (the principal excitatory neurotransmitter) into GABA (the principal inhibitory neurotransmitter).

GABA can also be synthesized from putrescine by diamine oxidase and aldehyde dehydrogenase.

Historically it was thought that exogenous GABA did not penetrate the blood–brain barrier, but more current research describes the notion as being unclear pending further research.

Metabolism
GABA transaminase enzymes catalyze the conversion of 4-aminobutanoic acid (GABA) and 2-oxoglutarate (α-ketoglutarate) into succinic semialdehyde and glutamate. Succinic semialdehyde is then oxidized into succinic acid by succinic semialdehyde dehydrogenase and as such enters the citric acid cycle as a usable source of energy.

Pharmacology
Drugs that act as allosteric modulators of GABA receptors (known as GABA analogues or GABAergic drugs), or increase the available amount of GABA, typically have relaxing, anti-anxiety, and anti-convulsive effects (with equivalent efficacy to lamotrigine based on studies of mice). Many of the substances below are known to cause anterograde amnesia and retrograde amnesia.

In general, GABA does not cross the blood–brain barrier, although certain areas of the brain that have no effective blood–brain barrier, such as the periventricular nucleus, can be reached by drugs such as systemically injected GABA. At least one study suggests that orally administered GABA increases the amount of human growth hormone (HGH). GABA directly injected to the brain has been reported to have both stimulatory and inhibitory effects on the production of growth hormone, depending on the physiology of the individual. 

GABA enhances the catabolism of serotonin into N-acetylserotonin (the precursor of melatonin) in rats. It is thus suspected that GABA is involved in the synthesis of melatonin and thus might exert regulatory effects on sleep and reproductive functions.

Chemistry
Although in chemical terms, GABA is an amino acid (as it has both a primary amine and a carboxylic acid functional group), it is rarely referred to as such in the professional, scientific, or medical community. By convention the term "amino acid", when used without a qualifier, refers specifically to an alpha amino acid. GABA is not an alpha amino acid, meaning the amino group is not attached to the alpha carbon. Nor is it incorporated into proteins as are many alpha-amino acids.

GABAergic drugs

GABAA receptor ligands are shown in the following table

GABAergic pro-drugs include chloral hydrate, which is metabolised to trichloroethanol, which then acts via the GABAA receptor.

The plant kava contains GABAergic compounds, including kavain, dihydrokavain, methysticin, dihydromethysticin and yangonin.

Other GABAergic modulators include:

GABAB receptor ligands.
Agonists: baclofen, propofol, GHB, phenibut.
Antagonists: phaclofen, saclofen.
GABA reuptake inhibitors: deramciclane, hyperforin, tiagabine.
GABA transaminase inhibitors: gabaculine, phenelzine, valproate, vigabatrin, lemon balm (Melissa officinalis).
GABA analogues: pregabalin, gabapentin, picamilon, progabide

In plants 
GABA is also found in plants. It is the most abundant amino acid in the apoplast of tomatoes. Evidence also suggests a role in cell signalling in plants.

See also
3-Aminoisobutyric acid
4-aminobutyrate transaminase (GABA-transaminase) deficiency
GABA analogue
GABA receptor
GABA tea
Giant depolarizing potential
Spastic diplegia, a GABA deficiency neuromuscular neuropathology
Spasticity
Succinic semialdehyde dehydrogenase deficiency

Notes

References

External links

 

Gamma-aminobutyric acid MS Spectrum
Scholarpedia article on GABA
List of GABA neurons on NeuroLex.org
Effects of Oral Gamma-Aminobutyric Acid (GABA) Administration on Stress and Sleep in Humans: A Systematic Review

Inhibitory amino acids
Amino acids

GABA receptor agonists
GABAA receptor positive allosteric modulators
Glycine receptor agonists
Biology of obsessive–compulsive disorder
Peripherally selective drugs
 
Non-proteinogenic amino acids